Persikaba stands for Persatuan Sepakbola Indonesia Blora is an Indonesian football club based in Blora Regency, Central Java. They currently play in Liga 3.

References

External links 
 

Football clubs in Indonesia
Football clubs in Central Java
Association football clubs established in 1967
1967 establishments in Indonesia